Mayar Sherif Ahmed Abdel-Aziz (born 5 May 1996) is an Egyptian tennis player. She is the younger sister of Rana Sherif Ahmed. She has career-high WTA rankings of world No. 44 in singles, achieved on 18 July 2022, and No. 88 in doubles, reached on 11 July 2022. Sherif has won one singles title on the WTA Tour, at the 2022 Emilia-Romagna Open. She has also won four singles titles and one doubles title on the WTA Challenger Tour along with nine singles titles and six doubles titles on the ITF Women's Circuit.

Sherif spent her final two years of college at Pepperdine University in Malibu, California, graduating in 2018 with a bachelor of science in sports medicine. She was part of the university's tennis team and was an All-American in both 2017 and 2018, and the West Coast Conference Player of the Year in 2018. She made the semifinals of the 2018 NCAA singles tournament and ended her senior season ranked 11th in the nation in singles.

Sherif made her WTA Tour singles debut at the 2020 Prague Open. She was the first Egyptian female player in a main draw of a Grand Slam tournament, at the 2020 French Open.
She made history again for Egyptian tennis at the 2021 Australian Open, becoming the first woman from her nation to win a Grand Slam main-draw match. She became also the first Egyptian woman to qualify for the Olympic Games and reach a WTA tournament final in Cluj-Napoca.

Playing for Egypt Fed Cup team, she has a win–loss record of 19–11 (in doubles: 10–5) in Fed Cup competition.

Professional career

2019–2020: Historic Grand Slam debut and WTA debut
Sherif started 2020 playing in the Australian Open qualifiers which was her first appearance at a WTA tournament. She lost in the first round of qualifiers to Ann Li. In March, she won the title at a $25k tournament in Antalya defeating Dalma Gálfi in the final. 

In August, at the Prague Open Prague Open, Sherif advanced through the qualifying making her main-draw debut at WTA Tour-level. In the first round, she lost there to Laura Siegemund in three sets.

In late September 2020, Sherif defeated Camila Osorio, Caty McNally and Giulia Gatto-Monticone in the French Open qualifying. Making her Grand Slam main-draw debut as the first Egyptian female player, Sherif came up against second seed and world No. 3, Karolína Plíšková, losing in three sets.

2021: Historic first Grand Slam match win, WTA finals and Olympics & top 100 debut

Sherif again made history as the first Egyptian woman to win a match at a Grand Slam tournament, beating Chloe Paquet in the first round of the Australian Open.

She delivered another highlight, when she as the first Egyptian woman qualified for the Tokyo Olympics, after winning the 2019 African Games.

Sherif also became the first Egyptian woman to reach a WTA Tour singles and doubles final in Cluj-Napoca. In singles, she defeated top seed Alizé Cornet, Alex Eala, Kristína Kučová and Mihaela Buzărnescu but lost to Andrea Petkovic in the final. In doubles, partnering Katarzyna Piter, she lost to Natela Dzalamidze and Kaja Juvan in the final. As a result, she entered the top 100 at world No. 97 on 9 August 2021, the first Egyptian woman to do so, and also reached a career-high in doubles at No. 154.

2022: Historic maiden title, French Open win & top 50 in singles, top 100 in doubles
She made her top 50 debut in singles and reached world No. 98 in doubles on 16 May 2022.

At the French Open, she became the first Egyptian woman to win a Roland Garros main draw match, after beating Marta Kostyuk in two sets (6-3, 7-5). She withdrew in the second round due to injury.

At the Emilia-Romagna Open in Parma, Sherif defeated Anna Bondár, Simona Waltert, Lauren Davis, and Ana Bogdan to reach her second WTA 250 final, and her first since the previous summer. She then defeated top seed and world No. 7, Maria Sakkari, in straight sets to claim her first singles title and became the first woman from Egypt to win a WTA Tour title. The win against Sakkari was also her first top-10 win.

Performance timeline

Only main-draw results in WTA Tour, Grand Slam tournaments, Fed Cup/Billie Jean King Cup and Olympic Games are included in win–loss records.

Singles
Current after the 2023 Indian Wells Open.

Doubles

WTA career finals

Singles: 2 (1 title, 1 runner-up)

Doubles: 2 (2 runner–ups)

WTA Challenger finals

Singles: 4 (4 titles)

Doubles: 3 (1 title, 2 runner-ups)

ITF Circuit finals

Singles: 18 (9 titles, 9 runner–ups)

Doubles: 13 (6 titles, 7 runner–ups)

Head-to-head records

Record against top 10 players

Top 10 wins

Notes

References

External links
 
 
 
 Pepperdine Waves bio

1996 births
Living people
Egyptian female tennis players
Sportspeople from Cairo
African Games gold medalists for Egypt
African Games medalists in tennis
African Games silver medalists for Egypt
African Games bronze medalists for Egypt
Competitors at the 2011 All-Africa Games
Pepperdine Waves women's tennis players
Olympic tennis players of Egypt
Tennis players at the 2020 Summer Olympics